Dar Sila is the name of the wandering sultanate of the Dar Sila Daju, a multi-tribal ethnic group in Chad and Sudan. The number of the people in this group exceeds 50,000. They speak the Sila language, a Nilo-Saharan language. Most members of this ethnic group are Muslims.

Location
Geographically, Dar Sila is located in southeastern territory of the Republic of Chad. It borders the Salamat Region of Chad in the southwest, Ouaddaï Region in the north and Assoungha Department of Chad in the southeast, and Darfur Region of Sudan to the east.

Capital
Its capital is Goz Beïda which means in Arabic "the white sand dune".

History

Its history goes back to Darfur when Sultan Omar Kasefroge, the last sultan of Darfur during the Daju rule of this area, who ordered removal of Jabel Daju in order to join the other 99 Daju Jabels. Consequently, many adults and warriors died.

According to Colonel Largeau, Commander in Chief of Goz Beida during the French invasion of Dar Sila, a manuscript was found at the palace of the Sultan Moustafa walad Sultan Bakhit tracing the origin of the Daju. It states that the Daju came and ruled Darfur long ago from Yemen in 619 to 892 until 1212 AD then left Jabel Marra to Hajar Kadjano in 1417 to 1612 A.D.

The above dates suggest that they might have reached Dar Sila in 1613 to 1614 A.D.

Chronology of sultans
Chronology of the Sultans of Dar Sila began with one of Kaseforge's sons, Sultan Ahmed al-Daj. He was followed by Sultan Ibrahim, Sultan Adam, Sultan Hassaballah, Sultan Habib, Sultan Shuaeib, Sultan Salih, Sultan Issa Hajar, Sultan Abd el-Karim, Sultan Abd el-Latif, Sultan El-Haj Bolad, Sultan Ishaq Abu-Risha, Sultan Mohamed Bakhit and his son Sultan Moustafa.

A brother of Sultan Ahmed el-Daj called Farouk "Ferne" refused to live in one sultanate in Dar Sila. Therefore he led his clans and soldiers to settle in Mongo where he established another small sultanate known as Dar Daju in the Guera Province to the west of Dar Sila.

See also
 Chad
 Geography of Chad

References

LARGEAU, (Colonel), Instructions au capitaine Gillet, commandant du poste de Goz Beida: 3 javier 1912 (Archive Goz Beida).
LARGEAU, (Colonel), La situation du Territoire militaire du Tchad au d'ebut de 1912: Bulletin du Comit'e de l'Afrique francaise. Renseignements coloniaux, 1913.

2nd millennium in Chad
Sultanates